Galho or mix rice dish is a popular Naga food made from a mixture of rice, vegetables and various meats. It is usually served simple that is with its main ingredients but one can try or put various other ingredients into the Galho.

General recipes 
Galho uses different kinds of ingredients such as rice, Chinese knotweed, pork or beef, various vegetables and so on.

See also
 Naga cuisine

References

External links

Naga cuisine